The 1981 LPGA Tour was the 32nd season since the LPGA Tour officially began in 1950. The season ran from January 29 to November 8. The season consisted of 36 official money events. Donna Caponi won the most tournaments, five. Beth Daniel led the money list with earnings of $206,998, becoming the first player to win over $200,000 in a season.

The season saw the first tournament with a $50,000 first prize, the World Championship of Women's Golf. There were five first-time winners in 1981: Patty Hayes, Kathy Hite, Cathy Reynolds, Patty Sheehan, and Beth Solomon.

The tournament results and award winners are listed below.

Tournament results
The following table shows all the official money events for the 1981 season. "Date" is the ending date of the tournament. The numbers in parentheses after the winners' names are the number of wins they had on the tour up to and including that event. Majors are shown in bold.

^ - weather-shortened tournament

Awards

References

External links
LPGA Tour official site
1981 season coverage at golfobserver.com

LPGA Tour seasons
LPGA Tour